Lasków  is a village in the administrative district of Gmina Dąbrówka, within Wołomin County, Masovian Voivodeship, in east-central Poland.

As Laskowo-Głuchy, it is the birthplace of poet Cyprian Kamil Norwid (1821–1883).

References

Villages in Wołomin County